Basic helix-loop-helix family, member a9 is a protein in humans that is encoded by the BHLHA9 gene.

References

External links

Further reading 

 
 
 

Protein domains